Charles Snow may refer to:

 Charles E. Snow (1910–1967), American anthropologist
 Charles Wilbert Snow (1884–1977), American politician
 C. P. Snow (Charles Percy Snow, 1905–1980), English physicist and novelist